Melittia doddi is a moth of the family Sesiidae. It is known only from Queensland, where it was collected near Kuranda.

The length of the forewings is 12–14 mm for males and 13–14 mm for females.

Taxonomy
Melittia doddi was formerly considered a synonym or variety of Melittia amboinensis C. Felder, 1861 .

External links
Image at CSIRO Entomology
Classification of the Superfamily Sesioidea (Lepidoptera: Ditrysia), listed as Melittia amboinensis
New records and a revised checklist of the Australian clearwing moths (Lepidoptera: Sesiidae)
Checklist of the Sesiidae of the world (Lepidoptera: Ditrysia)

Moths of Australia
Sesiidae
Moths described in 1916
Taxa named by Ferdinand Le Cerf